A Different Approach is a 1978 live-action short film starring Michael Keaton alongside an all-star cast.

Summary
The film is an all-star educational film about the positive side of hiring people with disabilities. A committee of government representatives sits and watch the film Michael Keaton's character's assembled to sell companies on hiring people with disabilities, which takes "a different approach" by combining several approaches—most of them suggested by Hollywood personalities.

Accolades
The film was nominated for an Academy Award for Best Live Action Short Film.

External links

References

1978 films
1978 short films
Films about intellectual disability
American short films
1970s English-language films